Holicong is a populated place situated in Buckingham Township in Bucks County, Pennsylvania.

The name Holicong is Native American in origin.

References

Populated places in Bucks County, Pennsylvania
Pennsylvania placenames of Native American origin